The Carnegie Library of Moultrie is a historic Carnegie Library on a corner lot in downtown Moultrie, Georgia that was built in 1908. It was added to the National Register of Historic Places in 1982. It is located at 39 North Main Street.

It is a two-story red brick building with some Georgian Revival elements.  Its brick walls are load-bearing and laid in stretcher bond upon a rusticated cut stone foundation.  It has quoins made of the same rusticated granite stone.  Its front entrance is flanked by pilasters.

The building was modified in cosmetic ways in 1973 when the building was converted to law offices.

It is one of the oldest public buildings in Moultrie.

It is a contributing building in the NRHP-listed Moultrie Commercial Historic District.

The 1982 NRHP nomination stated that the library's architect was unknown, but the 1994 nomination document for the district lists T.F. Lockwood as the architect.

See also
National Register of Historic Places listings in Colquitt County, Georgia

References

Library buildings completed in 1908
Libraries on the National Register of Historic Places in Georgia (U.S. state)
Buildings and structures in Colquitt County, Georgia
Colonial Revival architecture in Georgia (U.S. state)
Carnegie libraries in Georgia (U.S. state)
Individually listed contributing properties to historic districts on the National Register in Georgia (U.S. state)